Karadirlik is a village in Tarsus district of Mersin Province, Turkey. At  it is in Çukurova (Cilicia of the antiquity) and to the north of Tarsus. It is situated to the northwest   of  Berdan Dam reservoir and to the south of Keşbükü creek a branch of Berdan River. The population of Karadirlik was 702  as of 2011. Situated in the fertile plains, farming is the major economic activity. Olive, cucumber and grapes are the most important crops, and there are also some chicken farms. In 2010, the village and its fields suffered from a particularly bad hailstorm.

References

Villages in Tarsus District